is a bridge located in Yamaguchi Prefecture, Japan. The  bridge connects the island of Tsunoshima to mainland Japan.

Overview

Tsunoshima Bridge crosses the Amagaseto Strait in the Sea of Japan, linking the island of Tsunoshima with the mainland at Hōhoku, Shimonoseki.

The bridge is noted for its distinctive curved shape: it proceeds straight as it extends from the mainland before curving as it passes Hatoshima, an uninhabited island located in the strait. As Tsunoshima Bridge is located within the borders of Kita-Nagato Kaigan Quasi-National Park, the bridge was intentionally curved to avoid passing through Hatoshima, thus preserving its natural environment; the height of the bridge was also limited to preserve the landscape of the surrounding area.

History
Prior to the construction of Tsunoshima Bridge, Tsunoshima and the mainland were connected by a ferry that made seven daily round-trips. The ferry was frequently delayed and cancelled due to inclement weather, particularly in the winter; in 1983, a group of roughly 100 island residents formed a group to advocate for the construction of a bridge. Construction on Tsunoshima Bridge began in September 1993, with a total project cost of JP¥14.9 billion. The bridge opened on November 3, 2000. In 2003, the bridge was recognized with the Excellence Award by the Japan Society of Civil Engineers for its environmentally-conscious design.

Tourism
While the transportation access provided by Tsunoshima Bridge has contributed significantly to Tsunoshima's tourism industry, the bridge is itself a popular tourist destination for its panoramic views of the island and its proximity to several sub-tropical beaches. Several viewing platforms and other amenities are located at Amagase Park, a park that is split into two sections on both ends of the bridge. Automobile commercials and television dramas are frequently filmed on and around the bridge.

Gallery

See also
 Tsunoshima Lighthouse

References

External links

 Video reel of Tsunoshima Bridge published by the Sankei Shimbun

Bridges in Japan